Tîrșiței is a commune in Teleneşti District, Moldova. It is composed of two villages, Flutura and Tîrșiței.

References

Communes of Telenești District